Ekin is a unisex Turkish given name. And may refer to:

Given name
Ekin Deligöz, German politician of Turkish descent
Ekin Cheng, Hong Kong singer and actor
Ekin Tunçay Turan, Turkish stage actress and translator
Ekin-Su Cülcüloğlu, English actress and television personality

Surnames
Hirose Kinzō also known as Ekin, Japanese painter
Tom Ekin, Irish politician

Places
Ekin, Indiana

Turkish unisex given names